Valeri Valentinovich Shmarov (born 23 February 1965 in Voronezh) is a Russian former professional footballer and currently a coach.

International career
Shmarov made his debut for USSR national football team on 23 August 1989 in a friendly against Poland. He was not selected for the 1990 FIFA World Cup squad.

Personal life
His sons Denis Shmarov and Yegor Shmarov are also professional footballers (in the third-tier PFL).

Honours
Spartak Moscow
 Soviet Top League: 1987, 1989

Individual
 Soviet Top League top scorer: 1990 (12 goals)
 Top 33 players year-end list: 1995

References
 Profile

External links
 

Living people
1965 births
Association football forwards
Soviet footballers
Soviet Union international footballers
Soviet expatriate footballers
Russian footballers
Russian expatriate footballers
Soviet Top League players
Russian Premier League players
K League 1 players
Expatriate footballers in Germany
Expatriate footballers in South Korea
Bundesliga players
FC Fakel Voronezh players
PFC CSKA Moscow players
FC Spartak Moscow players
Karlsruher SC players
Arminia Bielefeld players
Jeonnam Dragons players
Russian football managers
FC Fakel Voronezh managers
FC Sibir Novosibirsk managers
Russian expatriate sportspeople in South Korea
FC Arsenal Tula players
Sportspeople from Voronezh